Franklin Covey Co., trading as FranklinCovey and based in Salt Lake City, Utah, is a coaching company which provides training and assessment services in the areas of leadership, individual effectiveness, and business execution for organizations and individuals. The company was formed on May 30, 1997, as a result of merger between Hyrum W. Smith's Franklin Quest and Stephen R. Covey's Covey Leadership Center. Among other products, the company has marketed the FranklinCovey planning system, modeled in part on the writings of Benjamin Franklin, and The 7 Habits of Highly Effective People, based on Covey's research into leadership ethics.

FC Organizational Products, LLC is the official licensee of FranklinCovey products and continues to produce paper planning products based on Covey's time management system. FranklinCovey also has sales channels in more than 120 countries worldwide.

History
FranklinCovey began as a result of separate entities founded by two different Utah entrepreneurs. Franklin Quest Co. was founded in Salt Lake City in 1983 by Hyrum W. Smith and was so named because of its focus on time management and the organizational principles based on Benjamin Franklin’s writings. Two years later, Stephen Covey formed Stephen R. Covey and Associates in Provo, Utah, to offer leadership seminars based on his ongoing research on The 7 Habits of Highly Effective People, a book he would publish four years later. Stephen R. Covey and Associates changed its name to the Covey Leadership Center the same year.

Franklin Quest and the Covey Leadership Center operated independently until January 22, 1997, when the two companies jointly announced a merger and public offering valued at $160 million. The merged entity took its new name, FranklinCovey, from the first part of Franklin Quest's name and founder Stephen Covey's last name. Both Covey and Smith remained as co-chairs of the new company's board and remained so until their deaths in 2012 and 2019, respectively.

Effect of merger
Hyrum W. Smith, then the CEO of Franklin Quest, expected that the 1997 acquisition would increase market value through the synergistic combination of Covey's 7 Habits book with the Franklin Planner system and with the company's associated training courses. However, after the merger FranklinCovey's stock price dropped from around $20 per share to a low of under $1 per share by early 2003. As of June 1, 2006, it traded around $7 per share which has increased their purchase rate. From late 2009 to mid-2010, the stock price moved in the range $5.5 to $8. By 2019, the stock price improved to the $20 to $39 range with annual revenue reported at $225.36 million.

Products and services
In the early 2000s, the company focused on marketing a variety of book and audio products based on Covey's 7 Habits material, as well as numerous titles by other FranklinCovey consultants.

The PlanPlus software division, which previously developed software plugins for Microsoft Outlook and standalone cloud-based planning tools, was sold to Complete XRM in 2006.

In 2008, FranklinCovey's CEO, Bob Whitman, changed the company's direction by selling off its paper products business and shifting focus on in-person training sessions and live-online training through the internet. The spinoff of the paper planner business became known as FC Organizational Products and maintains a contract with FranklinCovey as the authorized licensee of the brand name. Together the two companies still maintain one retail location, located at FranklinCovey's corporate campus in Salt Lake City.

Also in 2008, FranklinCovey's Education division launched The Leader in Me, a leadership curriculum for K-12 schools based on a book by the same title and which was coauthored by Stephen Covey and his son Sean Covey.

FranklinCovey has more recently focused on various in-person and live-online training for individuals and organizations, ranging from leadership development training, business execution planning, sales performance, and individual effectiveness training. Typically, the company will correspond their products with book launches written by FranklinCovey consultants or industry thought leaders. The company's core training products it remains known for is The 7 Habits of Highly Effective People, Leading at the Speed of Trust, and The 4 Disciplines of Execution.

In 2016, FranklinCovey pivoted its business model to become primarily an online subscription company with its All Access Pass solution—effectively providing all of its training content available live, live-online or on-demand, for an annual fee.

References

External links
 FranklinCovey history at Funding Universe

Companies listed on the New York Stock Exchange
Companies established in 1997
Companies based in Utah
1997 establishments in Utah
1997 initial public offerings